The 2006 Northeast Conference men's basketball tournament was held in March. The tournament featured the league's top eight seeds. Monmouth won the championship, its first, and received the conferences automatic bid to the 2006 NCAA Tournament.

Format
For the second straight year, the NEC Men’s Basketball Tournament will consist of an eight-team playoff format with all games played at the home of the higher seed. After the quarterfinals, the teams will be reseeded so the highest remaining seed plays the lowest remaining seed in the semifinals.

Bracket

All-tournament team
Tournament MVP in bold.

References

Northeast Conference men's basketball tournament
Tournament
Northeast Conference men's basketball tournament
Northeast Conference men's basketball tournament